Stanisław Grolicki (1892–1947) was a Polish film actor.

Selected filmography
 Prokurator Alicja Horn (1933)
 Bohaterowie Sybiru (1936)
 Daddy Gets Married (1936)
 Znachor (1937)
 Halka (1937)
 Florian (1938)
 Profesor Wilczur (1938)
 The Three Hearts (1939)
 The Vagabonds (1939)

Bibliography
 Skaff, Sheila. The Law of the Looking Glass: Cinema in Poland, 1896-1939. Ohio University Press, 2008.

External links

1892 births
1947 deaths
Polish male film actors
Male actors from Kraków
20th-century Polish male actors